A Woman's Resurrection is a lost 1915 silent drama based on Leo Tolstoy's 1899 novel Resurrection. William Fox produced the feature.

Cast

See also
1937 Fox vault fire
Resurrection, 1918 film

References

External links
 A Woman's Resurrection at IMDb.com

1915 films
American silent feature films
Fox Film films
Films directed by J. Gordon Edwards
Lost American films
Films based on Resurrection
American black-and-white films
Silent American drama films
1915 drama films
Films set in Russia
1910s American films